Invest Europe is a trade association representing Europe's private equity, venture capital and infrastructure sectors, as well as their investors. 

Formed in 1983 as the European Private Equity and Venture Capital Association (EVCA), it rebranded as Invest Europe on 1 October 2015.

Invest Europe contributes to policy affecting private capital investment in Europe, providing information on its members' role in the economy and publishing research on industry trends and developments. It also publishes a Professional Standards Handbook, a comprehensive set of standards and guidelines for the private equity industry.

The association hosts annual industry events in Europe, including the Investors' Forum, the Venture Capital Forum and the CFO Forum, as well as coordinating Invest Week in Brussels, which brings together investors, entrepreneurs and policymakers.

Invest Europe's data is used by a number of institutions including the European Investment Fund and the Organisation for Economic Co-operation and Development.

Based in Brussels, Invest Europe's Chief Executive Officer is Eric de Montgolfier and the current Chair is Klaus Hommels, a German venture capitalist based in Zurich, Switzerland and founder of venture capital firm Lakestar.

In February 2019, Invest Europe launched an updated Q&A guide to help private equity firms and investors prepare for the UK's exit from the European Union.

References

External links 
 

Private equity
Private equity firms of Europe
Venture capital
Investment promotion agencies